Robert Guillaume (born Robert Peter Williams; November 30, 1927 – October 24, 2017) was an American actor and singer, known for his role as Benson DuBois in the ABC television series Soap and its spin-off, Benson, as well as for voicing the mandrill Rafiki in The Lion King and related media thereof. In a career that spanned more than 50 years he worked extensively on stage, television and film. For his efforts he was nominated for a Tony Award for his portrayal of Nathan Detroit in Guys and Dolls, and twice won an Emmy Award for his portrayal of the character Benson DuBois, once in 1979 on Soap and in 1985 on Benson. He also won a Grammy Award in 1995 for his spoken word performance of an audiobook version of The Lion King. He is also known for his role as playing Eli Vance in the video game Half-Life 2.

Early life
Guillaume was born Robert Peter Williams in St. Louis to an alcoholic mother. After she abandoned him and several siblings, they were raised by their grandmother, Jeannette Williams. He studied at Saint Louis University and Washington University in St. Louis and served in the United States Army before pursuing an acting career. He adopted the surname Guillaume (French for William) as his stage name.

Career

Stage

After leaving university, Guillaume joined the Karamu Players in Cleveland and performed in musical comedies and opera. He toured the world in 1959 as a cast member of the Broadway musical Free and Easy. He made his Broadway debut in Kwamina in 1961. His other stage appearances included Golden Boy (with Sammy Davis Jr.), Tambourines to Glory, Guys and Dolls, for which he received a Tony Award nomination, Jacques Brel is Alive and Well and Living in Paris, and Purlie! His additional roles included Katherine Dunham's Bambouche and in Fly The Blackbird.

In 1964, he portrayed Sportin' Life in a revival of Porgy and Bess at New York City Center. Guillaume was a member of the Robert de Cormier Singers, performing in concerts and on television. He recorded an LP album, Columbia CS9033, titled Just Arrived as a member of The Pilgrims, a folk trio, with Angeline Butler and Millard Williams. Columbia records producer, Tom Wilson, had set out to create the Pilgrims as an answer to the popular folk trio, Peter, Paul and Mary. By early 1964, the Pilgrims had recorded a handful of songs and Wilson was looking for the right song for the group's debut single when then unknown singer/songwriter named Paul Simon arrived for a meeting with Wilson and eventually pitched his new composition, "The Sound of Silence". Wilson liked the song, had Simon record a demo for the group, but when Simon and his friend, Art Garfunkel, sang the song for Wilson in person, he signed them to a record contract instead of using it for The Pilgrims.

In 1990, Guillaume was cast in the Los Angeles production of The Phantom of the Opera, replacing Michael Crawford in the title role. Guillaume was the first Black actor to portray the character.

Television

Guillaume made several guest appearances on sitcoms, including Good Times, The Jeffersons, Sanford and Son, Saved By The Bell: The College Years and in the 1990s sitcoms The Fresh Prince of Bel-Air and A Different World. Guillaume also played Dr. Franklin in season 6, episode 6 ("Chain Letter") of the series All in the Family, in which he coyly referenced Marcus Welby, M.D., a TV series in which he had guest-starred in 1970.

His series-regular debut was on the ABC series Soap, playing  Benson, a butler, from 1977 to 1979. Guillaume continued the role in a spin-off series, Benson, which ran for 158 episodes from 1979 until 1986.

In 1985, Guillaume appeared in the television mini-series North and South as abolitionist leader Frederick Douglass, who escaped from slavery and became a leader of the anti-slavery movement prior to the American Civil War.

He also appeared as marriage counselor Edward Sawyer on The Robert Guillaume Show (1989), Detective Bob Ballard on Pacific Station (1991–1992), and television executive Isaac Jaffe on Aaron Sorkin's short-lived but critically acclaimed Sports Night (1998–2000). Guillaume suffered a mild stroke on January 14, 1999, while filming an episode of the latter series. He recovered and his character was later also depicted as having had a stroke. He also made a guest appearance on 8 Simple Rules for Dating My Teenage Daughter. He made one of his final TV appearances during season 5 on Oprah: Where Are They Now?

His voice was employed for characters in television series Captain Planet and the Planeteers, Fish Police, and Happily Ever After: Fairy Tales for Every Child. He was known for the voice of Rafiki in the movie The Lion King and its sequels and spin-offs. He lent his deep tenor voice as Mr. Thicknose in The Land Before Time VIII: The Big Freeze. He also supplied the voice for Eli Vance in the 2004 video game Half-Life 2 and its immediate episodic sequels.

Personal life
Guillaume was married twice; first to Marlene Williams in 1955, with whom he had two sons, Kevin and Jacques. Despite Guillaume choosing to follow his career early in the marriage, they did not divorce until 1984. His daughter, Melissa, was born in 1980; he and her mother, Patricia, raised her.  He then married Donna Brown in 1986; the couple had a daughter, Rachel. He fathered but did not raise another daughter, Patricia, by a different mother; she was born in 1950 and was raised by her grandparents. His son Jacques died on December 23, 1990, at the age of 32, of complications of AIDS.

In 1999, Guillaume suffered a stroke while working on Sports Night at Walt Disney Studios in Burbank, California. The stroke was minor, causing relatively slight damage and little effect on his speech. After six weeks in the hospital, he underwent a therapy of walks and gym sessions.

Death
Guillaume died of prostate cancer on October 24, 2017, at his home in Los Angeles, California.

Honors
Guillaume has a star on the St. Louis Walk of Fame. On November 28, 1984, he received a star on the Hollywood Walk of Fame for his work in the television industry.

Filmography

Film

Television

Theater

Music Videos

Video Games 

Sources:

Awards and nominations

References

External links
  
 
 
 
 
 St. Louis Walk of Fame 
 Robert Guillaume's oral history video excerpts at The National Visionary Leadership Project
 
 Robert Guillaume(Aveleyman)

1927 births
2017 deaths
20th-century American male actors
21st-century American male actors
African-American male actors
American male film actors
American male musical theatre actors
American male television actors
American male video game actors
American male voice actors
Audiobook narrators
Deaths from cancer in California
Deaths from prostate cancer
Grammy Award winners
Interactive Achievement Award winners
Male actors from St. Louis
Military personnel from Missouri
Outstanding Performance by a Lead Actor in a Comedy Series Primetime Emmy Award winners
Outstanding Performance by a Supporting Actor in a Comedy Series Primetime Emmy Award winners
Washington University in St. Louis alumni
African-American male singers